Nine for IX is the title for a series of documentary films which aired on ESPN. The documentaries were produced by ESPN Films in conjunction with espnW, and were intended to have the same creative, story-driven aspect as ESPN Films' other series, 30 for 30, with the series focusing on captivating stories of women in sports told through the lens of female filmmakers. The series' name is inspired by Title IX, federal civil rights legislation passed in 1972 that prohibited discrimination on the basis of sex in educational institutions receiving federal aid; Title IX has also been regarded as helping to expand women's and girls' access to athletic opportunities. The first film, Venus Vs., premiered on July 2, 2013.

List of Nine for IX films
The following films are all 60 minutes in length (including commercials).

Short films
After the first short aired with the full-length films, six additional short films were created, to begin airing in June 2014. The third, fourth, fifth, and sixth shorts debuted at the 2014 Los Angeles Film Festival on June 17, before airing with the additional shorts on espnW.com. Additionally, all Nine for IX Shorts aired back-to-back on August 2, 2014 on ESPN.

References

External links
Nine for IX collection website

Documentary films about women's association football
ESPN.com
ESPN original programming
2010s American documentary television series
2013 American television series debuts
2013 American television series endings